Nikolas Kozloff is an American academic, author and photojournalist. He currently writes for Al-Jazeera and has also been featured on BBC, CNN, National Public Radio, PBS' Charlie Rose show, The Daily Show and the pro-Bolivarian Revolution website Venezuelanalysis.com.

Personal life and education
Kozloff is the single child of Max and Joyce Kozloff. His mother Joyce is an artist and feminist, while his father Max is a photographer, critic and historian. The family is not religious but states that they recognize their Jewish culture.

Kozloff studied in Britain at Oxford University and received a doctorate in Latin American history from the university.

Works
An expert on South American affairs, Kozloff formerly worked for the Council on Hemispheric Affairs.

Kozloff's book Hugo Chávez : Oil, Politics and the Challenge to the United States was described as "generally positive in its treatment of" Chávez and his Bolivarian Revolution by Marxist magazine Political Affairs. A book review in The New York Times described the book's analysis as "essentially Marxist" filled with "new-lefty rhetoric" that was an "admiring study of Mr. Chávez", and quoted it describing Chávez as a "potentially dangerous enemy to the United States".

Kozloff also founded the Revolutionary Handbook, described as "a project which aims to inform discussion about how to bring about non-violent revolutionary change" that was influenced "by the Occupy Wall Street Movement". He has also written about Ukraine and East-West relations.

Publications

Books

References

Living people
1969 births
People from Brooklyn
Alumni of the University of Oxford
Anti-globalization activists
American political activists
Activists from New York (state)